Knollcroft is a historic home located at New Concord in Columbia County, New York.  It was built in 1880 as a summer retreat. It is a large, two-story brick-and-frame structure designed in the Queen Anne style.   It features a two-story, projecting polygonal bay with a hipped roof and a large, deep verandah.  Also on the property is a carriage house, well house, and privy.

It was added to the National Register of Historic Places in 1985.

References

Houses on the National Register of Historic Places in New York (state)
Queen Anne architecture in New York (state)
Houses completed in 1880
Houses in Columbia County, New York
National Register of Historic Places in Columbia County, New York